The intercalary month or epagomenal days of the ancient Egyptian, Coptic, and Ethiopian calendars are a period of five days in common years and six days in leap years in addition to those calendars' 12 standard months, sometimes reckoned as their thirteenth month. They originated as a periodic measure to ensure that the heliacal rising of Sirius would occur in the 12th month of the Egyptian lunar calendar but became a regular feature of the civil calendar and its descendants. Coptic and Ethiopian leap days occur in the year preceding Julian and Gregorian leap years.

Names

The period is also sometimes known as the "monthless days".

Parker also proposed that in some cases the intercalary month was known by the name Thoth after the festival that gave its name to the following month.

The Arabic name is also romanized as Nasie.

In Ethiopia, the period is known as Paguemain, Phagumien (Ṗagʷəmen), Pagume, or Pagumay (Ṗagume).

Egyptian calendars

Ancient

Until the  the beginnings of the months of the lunar calendar were based on observation, beginning at dawn on the morning when a waning crescent moon could no longer be seen. The intercalary month was added every two or three years as needed to maintain the heliacal rising of Sirius within the fourth month of the season of Low Water. This month may have had as many as 30 days. According to the civil calendar, the months fell in order with the rest regardless of the state of the moon. They always consisted of 30 days, each individually named and devoted to a particular patron deity, but the year was always followed by an intercalary month of only five days. Owing to the lack of a leap day, the calendar slowly cycled relative to the solar year and Gregorian date until the Ptolemaic and Roman eras.

The period of the intercalary month was considered spiritually dangerous and the pharaoh performed a ritual known as "Pacifying Sekhmet" to protect himself and the world from that god's plague. The period seems to have usually been a time of rest, placed between the New Year's Eve celebrations on 30Wep Renpet and the New Year's celebrations beginning on 1Thoth. Scribes sometimes omitted the entire period from their records of the year. Torches were carried and apotropaic charms were drawn on linen and worn around the neck.

The period was known as the "birthdays of the gods" as early as the Pyramid Texts. By the early Middle Kingdom, the days were specified and ordered:

 The first day was the Birth of Osiris. It was also originally known as the "Pure Bull in His Field", although that aspect of the intercalary festivities was later moved to the second day as Horus grew in importance.
 The second was the Birth of Horus.
 The third was the Birth of Set.
 The fourth was the Birth of Isis ( or ).
 The last day was the Birth of Nephthys. It was originally the most important, heralding in the New Year's festival and celebrating a "child in his nest", but these aspects shifted to the fourth night in the Ptolemaic and Roman period owing to the greater importance of Isis and her longstanding connection with the star Sirius.

Throughout the days, their connections to the solar boat of Ra, fish, and a "creator of terror" were also stressed. In all but a handful of texts, however, the days are merely numbered as "Day ~ of the Five Days upon the Year".

Ptolemy III's Canopus Decree was an attempted calendrical reform in 239BC which would have inserted a sixth day into the intercalary month, but it was abandoned due to the hostility of the priests and people of Egypt. The leap day was finally established by Augustus in 30, 26, or 25BC. Under this "Alexandrian calendar", the epagomenal days ran from Julian 24 August to 28 August in common years and to 29 August in leap years.

Coptic

In the present-day Coptic calendar, the intercalary month remains the same as the Alexandrian dates in the Julian calendar. In terms of the Gregorian calendar, it has begun on 6 September and ended on 10 September in common years and 11 September in leap years since AD1900 (1616) and will continue to do so until AD2100 (1816). In that year, the Gregorian calendar's lack of a leap day will cause the Coptic month to advance another day relative to it and it will run from 7 September to 11 September. Coptic leap years are not computed as divisors of four in that calendar's Diocletian era but occur in the year prior to the Gregorian leap year.

The Coptic liturgical calendar of the month consists of:

Ethiopian calendar

In the present-day Ethiopian calendar, Paguemain or Pagume is identical to the Coptic intercalary month, beginning on 6 September and ending on 10 September in common years and 11 September in leap years. Its leap years occur at the same time and its dates will also shift forward one day relative to the Gregorian calendar in AD2100 (2092).

The unusual calendar is notably used in Ethiopian tourist information to advertise the country's "thirteen months of sunshine".

Mandaean calendar

The Mandaean calendar consisting of 12 30-day months, with 5 epagomenals inserted at the end of every 8th month (Mandaic: Šumbulta). These 5 extra days constitute the Parwanaya (or Panja) festival in the Mandaean calendar.

See also
 Egyptian, Coptic, and Ethiopian calendars
 Babylonian, Zoroastrian, and Armenian calendars
 Persian and Hebrew calendars
 Islamic calendar
 Sansculottides

Notes

References

Citations

Bibliography
 .
 .
 .
 .
 .

Egyptian calendar
Months of the Coptic calendar
Ethiopian culture